Daşköpri (also known as Tashkepri) is a town in Mary, Turkmenistan.

References

Populated places in Mary Region